Lyndon Saul Ogbourne  (born 18 May 1983) is an English actor. He is known for his role as Nathan Wylde in the ITV1 soap opera Emmerdale.

Background
Ogbourne began acting at the age of six. He was educated at Commonweal School before studying drama, media and photography at Swindon College. He trained at the London Academy of Music and Dramatic Art.

Ogbourne's grandfather, Michael Beint and his brother, Tristan Beint, are also actors.

Career
Ogbourne started his television career in 2000 with a part in TV film Anchor Me opposite Annette Crosbie. Guest roles in Spooks and Robin Hood followed in 2006. In 2008, Ogbourne appeared in Doctors as Ed Toomey.

In February 2009, Ogbourne joined Emmerdale as part of the new Wylde family. In August 2010 it was announced he was to leave the show.

In 2011 he toured the UK in Agatha Christie's play The Verdict.

In 2016 he played Connor in the feature film White Island.

Filmography

Awards and nominations

References

External links

Radio interview at BBC Wiltshire

1983 births
Living people
English male soap opera actors
Alumni of the London Academy of Music and Dramatic Art
People from Swindon